Christ's Church may refer to:

Churches in Canada
 Christ's Church Cathedral (Hamilton, Ontario)

Churches in China
Christ's Church, Changsha
Christ's Church, Changshu
Christ's Church, Changzhou in Jiangsu
Christ's Church, Fuyang District in Hangzhou, Zhejiang
Christ's Church, Jinan in Shandong
Christ's Church, Jinyuan in Shanxi
Christ's Church, Tangxi in Hangzhou, Zhejiang
Christ's Church, Mochou Road in Nanjing, Jiangsu
Christ's Church, Nanjing in Jiangsu
Daosheng Christ's Church in Gulou District of Nanjing, Jiangsu
Christ's Church, Qingdao in Shandong
Christ's Church, Shenzhen
Christ's Church, Shangcheng District in Hangzhou, Zhejiang
Christ's Church, Siming District in Xiamen, Fujian
Christ's Church, Tianshui Subdistrict in Hangzhou, Zhejiang
Christ's Church, Ürümqi in Ürümqi, Xinjiang
Christ's Church, Wuxi in Jiangsu

Churches in Lithuania
 Christ's Resurrection Church, Kaunas

Churches in Scotland
 Cill Chriosd

Churches in the United States

Alabama
 Christ's Church (Birmingham)

Arizona
 Christ's Church (Parker)
 Christ's Church of the Valley (Peoria) 
 Christ's Church (Phoenix)

Arkansas
 Christ's Church (Fayetteville)

California
 Christ's Church (San Dimas)

Colorado
 Christ's Church (Evergreen)

Florida
 Christ's Church, Jacksonville
 Christ's Church, Fleming Island
 Christ's Church (Ocala)

Georgia
 Christ's Church, Camden County

Hawaii
 Christ's Church (Kapolei)

Illinous
 Christ's Church (Effingham)

Indiana
 Christ's Church (Ft. Wayne)
 Christ's Church (Butler)

Kansas
 Christ's Church (Holton)

Missouri
 Christ's Church (St. Peters)

New York
 Christ's Church (Brooklyn)
 Christ's Church (Rye)

Ohio
 Christ's Church (Mason)

Oregon
 Christ's Church (Monmouth)

Pennsylvania
 Christ's Church (Royersford)

Tennessee
 Christ's Church (Chattanooga)

Utah
 Christ's Church (The Righteous Branch)

Washington
 Christ's Church (Federal Way)

See also
 Church (building), a building used for worship in Christianity
 Christ Church (disambiguation)
 Church of Christ (disambiguation)
 Christian Church (disambiguation)